The wedding of Prince George, Duke of Kent, and Princess Marina of Greece and Denmark took place on Thursday, 29 November 1934, at Westminster Abbey. The Duke of Kent was the fourth son of King George V and Princess Mary of Teck, while Princess Marina was the youngest daughter of Prince Nicholas of Greece and Denmark and Grand Duchess Elena Vladimirovna of Russia. The couple were second cousins through mutual descent from King Christian IX of Denmark. As Princess Marina's cousin, Prince Philip, renounced his Greek and Danish titles prior to marrying Prince George's niece, then Princess Elizabeth, this is the most recent example of a marriage between a British prince or princess and a titled member of a foreign dynasty.

Engagement
The engagement between the Duke of Kent and Princess Marina of Greece and Denmark was announced on 28 August 1934. The news came as a surprise to the British public. The couple began courting after reconnecting at the home of Princess Marina's brother-in-law, Prince Paul of Yugoslavia, on Lake Bohinj in present-day Slovenia. The Duke prested Princess Marina with a platinum ring with a 7-carat square Kashmir sapphire with two baguette diamonds on either side. A first for a royal couple, they spoke to Movietone News shortly after announcing their engagement.

Princess Marina and her parents arrived in Dover on board the ferry TSS Canterbury on 22 November. The Princess and her parents, accompanied by her fiancé, travelled to London where they were met at Victoria Station by the King and Queen, the Prince of Wales and the Duke and Duchess of York.

On the eve of the wedding, the couple and their parents attended a performance of the play Theatre Royal by George S. Kaufman and Edna Ferber at the Lyric Theatre.

Wedding

The Duke of Kent and Princess Marina were married first in an Anglican service according to the Book of Common Prayer conducted by Cosmo Gordon Lang, Archbishop of Canterbury, assisted by William Foxley Norris, Dean of Westminster. It was the first British royal wedding to be broadcast live on the radio. A second Greek Orthodox service was performed by Germanos Strenopoulos, Archbishop of Thyateira and Great Britain, in the Private Chapel at Buckingham Palace.

Attendants
The Duke of Kent was supported by his two eldest brothers, the Prince of Wales and the Duke of York. Princess Marina was attended by eight bridesmaids:
 Princess Irene of Greece and Denmark (30), daughter of King Constantine I and Queen Sophia of the Hellenes, thus a paternal cousin of the bride
 Princess Katherine of Greece and Denmark (21), daughter of King Constantine I and Queen Sophia of the Hellenes, thus a paternal cousin of the bride
 Princess Eugénie of Greece and Denmark (24), daughter of Prince and Princess George of Greece and Denmark, thus a paternal cousin of the bride
 Grand Duchess Kira Kirillovna of Russia (25), daughter of Grand Duke Kirill Vladimirovich and Grand Duchess Victoria Feodorovna of Russia, thus a maternal cousin of the bride
 Princess Juliana of the Netherlands (25), daughter of Queen Wilhelmina and Prince Hendrick of the Netherlands
 Lady Iris Mountbatten (14), daughter of the Marquess and Marchioness of Carisbrooke, thus a paternal cousin, once removed, of the groom
 Princess Elizabeth of York (8), daughter of the Duke and Duchess of York, thus a niece of the groom
 Lady Mary Cambridge (10), daughter of the Marquess and Marchioness of Cambridge, thus a maternal cousin, once removed, of the groom

Attire

Princess Marina wore a  white silk and silver lamé brocade gown designed by Edward Molyneux. She wore a tulle veil with a diamond fringe tiara belonging to her mother.

The Duke of Kent wore ceremonial day dress of the Royal Navy with the insignia of the Order of the Garter, Order of St Michael and St George and the Royal Victorian Order.

Music
Prior to the service, works by Bach, Handel and Elgar were played on the organ. During the arrival of the groom, Trumpet Tune and Airs by Henry Purcell was played. The bride walked down the aisle to Sir Hubert Parry's bridal march from The Birds. Hymns sung during the service include "Praise, my soul, the King of heaven." Ernest Bullock composed a new anthem specially for the wedding. The ceremony finished with Felix Mendelssohn's "Wedding March"

Guests

Relatives of the groom
 The King and Queen, the groom's parents
 The Prince of Wales, the groom's brother
 The Duke and Duchess of York, the groom's brother and sister-in-law
 Princess Elizabeth of York, the groom's niece
 Princess Margaret Rose of York, the groom's niece
 The Princess Royal and The Earl of Harewood, the groom's sister and brother-in-law
 The Duke of Gloucester, the groom's brother
 The Princess Victoria, the groom's paternal aunt
 The Queen and King of Norway, the groom's paternal aunt and uncle
 The Duke of Connaught and Strathearn, the groom's paternal granduncle
 Prince and Princess Arthur of Connaught, the groom's paternal first cousin once removed and paternal first cousin
 The Earl of Athlone and Princess Alice, Countess of Athlone, the groom's maternal uncle and aunt
 The Princess Beatrice, the groom's paternal grandaunt
 The Marquess of Carisbrooke's family:
 Lady Iris Mountbatten, the groom's paternal second cousin
 Lady Mary Cambridge, the groom's maternal first cousin once removed

Relatives of the bride
 Prince and Princess Nicholas of Greece and Denmark, the bride's parents
 Princess and Prince Paul of Yugoslavia, the bride's sister and brother-in-law
 Princess Elizabeth, Countess of Törring-Jettenbach, and The Count of Törring-Jettenbach, the bride's sister and brother-in-law 
 King George II of the Hellenes, the bride's paternal first cousin
 Princess Irene of Greece and Denmark, the bride's paternal first cousin
 Princess Katherine of Greece and Denmark, the bride's paternal first cousin
 Prince and Princess George of Greece and Denmark, the bride's paternal uncle and aunt
 Prince Peter of Greece and Denmark, the bride's paternal first cousin
 Princess Eugénie of Greece and Denmark, the bride's paternal first cousin
 Prince Philip of Greece and Denmark, the bride's paternal first cousin
 Prince Christopher of Greece and Denmark, the bride's paternal uncle
 Grand Duke Kirill Vladimirovich and Grand Duchess Victoria Feodorovna of Russia, the bride's maternal uncle and aunt (and the groom's paternal first cousin once removed and her husband)
 Grand Duchess Kira Kirillovna of Russia, the bride's maternal first cousin (and the groom's paternal second cousin)

Foreign royal guests
 The King and Queen of Denmark, the bride and groom's mutual first cousin once removed, and his wife
 Prince Valdemar of Denmark, the bride and groom's mutual granduncle 
 Princess Juliana of the Netherlands, the bride's maternal half-first cousin once removed
 The Count of Flanders, the groom's paternal third cousin once removed

Other notable guests
 The Rt Hon. Ramsay MacDonald, Prime Minister of the United Kingdom
 The Rt Hon. Stanley Baldwin, Lord President of the Council
 The Rt Hon. David Lloyd George, former Prime Minister of the United Kingdom
 Mr and Mrs Ernest Simpson

Gifts
King George V presented his new daughter-in-law with a 36-stone diamond collet necklace which she wore on her wedding day. From Queen Mary, Princess Marina received a historic diamond and sapphire parure which had belonged to the Duchess of Cambridge. The City of London gave Princess Marina a diamond fringe tiara. Princess Nicholas gave her daughter a large diamond bow brooch. The Australian Government sent two small cups made of Australian gold. The Royal School of Needlework made a quilt for Princess Marina and the Duke of Kent. The gifts were displayed at St James's Palace.

Reception
A reception was held afterwards in the State Rooms of Buckingham Palace. Music at the reception was provided by the Royal Artillery Band.

The couple received congratulations from various world leaders, including Adolf Hitler.

Honeymoon
The couple spent their honeymoon at Himley Hall in Staffordshire.

References

George, Duke of Kent, and Princess Marina of Greece and Denmark
George, Duke of Kent, and Princess Marina of Greece and Denmark
George, Duke of Kent, and Princess Marina of Greece and Denmark
1934 in London
November 1934 events
1930s in the City of Westminster